Emilie Levienaise-Farrouch is a French pianist and composer based in London. She signed with FatCat Records' post-classical imprint 130701 in 2014 and Manners McDade in 2019. Her original score for Sarah Gavron's Rocks (2019) was nominated for a British Independent Film Award.

Early life
Levienaise-Farrouch was born in Paris and grew up in Bordeaux. She began training in classical piano as a child. She graduated with a Bachelor of Arts in Music from the University of Westminster in 2009 and a Master of Music in Acoustic Composition from Goldsmiths, University of London in 2010. During her studies, she worked for the online electronic music store Bleep. She got her start creating scores when she met film school students who needed music for their student films.

Discography

Albums and EPs

Commissions
 Audial for 2014 Victoria & Albert Museum exhibit
 "The Flaneur" for Queen Elizabeth Olympic Park
 Audial for Alice May Williams' exhibit at Speke Hall
 "The Minutes" for the 2017 BBC Proms
 "Oparin" for violinist Galya Bisengalieva

Filmography

Awards and nominations

Notes

References

External links

21st-century French women pianists
Alumni of Goldsmiths, University of London
Alumni of the University of Westminster
French expatriates in England
French film score composers
French women composers
Musicians from Bordeaux
Year of birth missing (living people)
Living people